The law of triviality is C. Northcote Parkinson's 1957 argument that people within an organization commonly or typically give disproportionate weight to trivial issues. Parkinson provides the example of a fictional committee whose job was to approve the plans for a nuclear power plant spending the majority of its time on discussions about relatively minor but easy-to-grasp issues, such as what materials to use for the staff bicycle shed, while neglecting the proposed design of the plant itself, which is far more important and a far more difficult and complex task.

The law has been applied to software development and other activities. The terms bicycle-shed effect, bike-shed effect, and bike-shedding were coined based on Parkinson's example; it was popularised in the Berkeley Software Distribution community by the Danish software developer Poul-Henning Kamp in 1999 and, due to that, has since become popular within the field of software development generally.

Argument

The concept was first presented as a corollary of his broader "Parkinson's law" spoof of management. He dramatizes this "law of triviality" with the example of a committee's deliberations on an atomic reactor, contrasting it to deliberations on a bicycle shed. As he put it: "The time spent on any item of the agenda will be in inverse proportion to the sum [of money] involved." A reactor is so vastly expensive and complicated that an average person cannot understand it (see ambiguity aversion), so one assumes that those who work on it understand it. However, everyone can visualize a cheap, simple bicycle shed, so planning one can result in endless discussions because everyone involved wants to implement their own proposal and demonstrate personal contribution.

After a suggestion of building something new for the community, like a bike shed, problems arise when everyone involved argues about the details. This is a metaphor indicating that it is not necessary to argue about every little feature based simply on having the knowledge to do so. Some people have commented that the amount of noise generated by a change is inversely proportional to the complexity of the change.

The law of triviality is supported by behavioural research. People tend to spend more time on small decisions than they should, and less time on big decisions than they should. A simple explanation is that during the process of making a decision, one has to assess whether enough information has been collected to make the decision. If people make mistakes about whether they have enough information, they will tend to stop too early for big decisions. The reason is that big decisions require collecting information for a long time. It leaves more time to make a mistake (and stop) before getting enough information. Conversely, for small decisions, where people should stop early, they may continue to ponder for too long by mistake.

Related principles and formulations 
There are several other principles, well-known in specific problem domains, which express a similar sentiment. 

Wadler's law, named for computer scientist Philip Wadler, is a principle which asserts that the bulk of discussion on programming-language design centers on syntax (which, for purposes of the argument, is considered a solved problem), as opposed to semantics. 

Sayre's law is a more general principle, which holds (among other formulations) that "In any dispute, the intensity of feeling is inversely proportional to the value of the issues at stake"; many formulations of the principle focus on academia.

See also

 Analysis paralysis
 Busy work
 Dunning–Kruger effect
 Fredkin's paradox
 Hofstadter's law
 How many angels can dance on the head of a pin?
 Jevons paradox
 List of eponymous laws
 Moral panic
 Omission bias
 Peter principle
 Procrastination
 Narcissism of small differences
 Sayre's Law
 Snackwell effect
 Student syndrome
 Time management
 Time to completion
 Tyranny of small decisions
 Zero-risk bias

References

Further reading

 Karl Fogel, Producing Open Source Software: How to Run a Successful Free Software Project, O'Reilly, 2005, "Bikeshed Effect" pp. 135, 261–268 (also online)
 Grace Budrys, Planning for the nation's health: a study of twentieth-century developments in the United States, Greenwood Press, 1986, p. 81 (see extract at Internet Archive)
 Bob Burton et al., Nuclear Power, Pollution and Politics, Routledge, 1990, p. ix (see extract at Google Books)
 Darren Chamberlain et al., Perl Template Toolkit, O'Reilly, 2004, p. 412 (see extract at Google Books)
 Donelson R. Forsyth, Group Dynamics, Brooks/Cole, 1990, p. 289 (see extract at Internet Archive)
 Henry Bosch, The Director at Risk: Accountability in the Boardroom, Allen & Unwin, 1995, p. 92 (see extract at Google Books)
 Brian Clegg, Crash Course in Personal Development, Kogan Page, 2002, p. 3 (see extract at Google Books)
 Richard M. Hodgetts, Management: Theory, Process, and Practice, Saunders, 1979, p. 115 (see extract at Google Books)
 Journal, v. 37–38 1975–1980, Chartered Institute of Transport, p. 187 (see extract at Google Books)
 Russell D. Archibald, Managing High-Technology Programs and Projects, John Wiley and Sons, 2003, p. 37 (see extract at Google Books)
 Kishor Bhagwati, Managing Safety: A Guide for Executives, Wiley-VCH, 2007,  p. 54 (see extract at Google Books)
 Jan Pen, Harmony and Conflict in Modern Society, (Trans. Trevor S. Preston)  McGraw–Hill, 1966 p. 195 (see extract at Internet Archive)
 Derek Salman Pugh et al., Great Writers on Organizations, Dartmouth, 1993, p. 116 (see extract at Google Books)
 The Federal Accountant v. 13 (September 1963 – June 1964), Association of Government Accountants, Federal Government Accountants Association, Cornell University Graduate School of Business and Public Administration, p. 16 (see extract at Google Books)
 Al Kelly, How to Make Your Life Easier at Work, McGraw–Hill, 1988, p. 127 (see extract at Google Books)
 Henry Mintzberg, Power in and Around Organizations: Dynamic Techniques of Winning, Prentice–Hall, 1983, p. 75 (see extract at Google Books)
 The Building Services Engineer v.40 1972–1973, Institution of Heating and Ventilating Engineers (Great Britain), Chartered Institution of Building Services (see extract at Google Books)
 Charles Hampden-Turner, Gentlemen and Tradesmen: The Values of Economic Catastrophe,  Routledge, 1983, p. 151 (see extract at Google Books)

External links
 "Why Should I Care What Color the Bikeshed Is?"  (FreeBSD FAQ)
 

Adages
1950s neologisms
Triviality
Organizational behavior